Roger Drury may refer to:

Roger Drury (died 1420), MP for Suffolk
Roger Drury (died 1599), MP for Great Yarmouth
Roger W. Drury (born 1914), winner of the 1979 Mark Twain Readers Award